The Theban Necropolis is located on the west bank of the Nile, opposite Luxor, in Egypt. As well as the more famous royal tombs located in the Valley of the Kings and the Valley of the Queens, there are numerous other tombs, more commonly referred to as Tombs of the Nobles (Luxor), the burial places of some of the powerful courtiers and persons of the ancient city.

There are at least 415 cataloged tombs, designated TT for Theban Tomb. There are other tombs whose position has been lost, or for some other reason do not conform to this classification. See for instance the List of MMA Tombs. Theban tombs tended to have clay funerary cones placed over the entrance of the tomb chapels. During the New Kingdom they were inscribed with the title and name of the tomb owner, sometimes with short prayers. Of the 400 recorded sets of cones, only about 80 come from cataloged tombs.

The numbering system was first published Arthur Weigall's 1908 Report on the Tombs of Shêkh Abd’ el Gûrneh and el Assasîf (up to TT 45-100) and then more fulsomely in Alan Gardiner and Arthur Weigall's 1913 A Topographical Catalogue of the Private Tombs of Thebes (TT 1 - 252). This was followed by Reginald Engelbach's A Supplement to the Topographical Catalogue of the Private Tombs of Thebes (TT 253 to 334), extended further in Bernard Bruyère, N. de Garis Davies, Ahmed Fakhry, and later in Bertha Porter's Topographical Bibliography of Ancient Egyptian Hieroglyphic Texts, Reliefs, and Paintings. In their publication, Gardiner and Weigall acknowledged that the numbers do not follow any topographical order, and are due the order in which the tombs were discovered.

TT1–TT100

TT101-TT200

TT201–TT300

TT301–TT400

TT401–TT415

Other tombs

Uncategorized
 Bab el-Gasus

Unknown location

Dra' Abu el-Naga'

El-Khokha

Sheikh Abd el-Qurna

Qurnet Murai

References

Theban Necropolis

Theban
Theban Tombs
Theban tombs